Emma (c. 1007-1062) was Sovereign Countess and Margravine of Provence from 1037 until 1062. 

She was the daughter of Rotbold II of Provence and Ermengarde of Burgundy. She inherited the title from her elder brother William III, and married William III of Toulouse.

With William, she had two children:
Pons, who succeeded to Toulouse
Bertrand, who succeeded Pons in Toulouse (1060) and his mother in Provence

Sources
Medieval Lands Project: Provence.
Lewis, Archibald R. The Development of Southern French and Catalan Society, 718–1050. University of Texas Press: Austin, 1965.

970s births
1062 deaths
Counts of Provence
Countesses of Toulouse
Provence, Marchioness of, Emma
11th-century women rulers
10th-century French women 
10th-century French people 
11th-century French women 
11th-century French people